Donatello, nicknamed Don or Donnie, is a superhero and one of the four main characters of the Teenage Mutant Ninja Turtles comics and all related media. He is the smartest and often gentlest of his brothers, bearing a purple mask over his eyes. He wields a bō staff, his primary signature weapon in all media. 
 
He is the adoptive and mutated son of Master Splinter, as well as the younger brother of Leonardo and Raphael, and the older brother of Michelangelo. He is the third eldest/second youngest brother of the turtles, and second-in-command of the team. A common trait in the franchise is that he is the tallest ninja turtle, demonstrated in the IDW comics, the DC crossover film, the 2014 reboot, and most notably, in the 2012 animated series. Donnie often speaks in technobabble with a natural aptitude for science and technology. His ninja skills are the lowest of the four turtles; as he relies on gadgets over combat skills. Like all of the brothers, he is named after a Renaissance artist; in this case, he is named after Italian sculptor Donatello. He is the favorite turtle of co-creator Peter Laird, who served as the basis of Donatello's personality.

Fictional character biography

Mirage Comics
In the comics, Donatello is depicted as the calmest turtle. While the comics' portrayal of the team has no official command structure, in the early stories he is depicted as the next in command, and the closest brother to Leonardo. In the first issue, he is the one that killed the Shredder by knocking him and his grenade off the roof. The second issue elaborated more on each turtles' personalities and opened with Donatello soldering a circuit. Later in the issue, Donatello states that he is "familiar with some computer systems" and helps April O'Neil deactivate the Mousers. During the turtles' exile to Northampton, Donatello becomes obsessed with fixing up and repairing the many broken things within the farmhouse they were living in. Most notably he spent days and nights fixing the boiler to give his family hot running water and builds a windmill and a water wheel to provide electricity. He also finds an old typewriter and writes his own personal credo.

In the Donatello one shot, Donatello encounters an artist called Kirby (an homage to the comic artist Jack Kirby) whose mysterious crystal brings his drawings to life before disappearing. The two newfound friends journey to a dimension inhabited by Kirby's creations and help the heroes defeat the invading monsters.

In the Shades of Grey storyline, Casey Jones encounters the turtle by a ravine as he was pondering "the fractal structure of natural patterns". Casey accuses the turtle of using big words and acting better than everyone else. Donatello suggests they should continue the conversation when Casey is sober. Grabbing a stick, an angry Jones continually pokes the turtle until he loses his temper and sends Casey careening into the water.

In the City at War storyline, the turtles return to New York to put an end to the Foot Clan's civil war. During a battle with Shredder's Elite Guards in the ruins of the Second Time Around Shop, Donatello falls through the floor and breaks his leg. Seeing their ally Karai subdued and about to be killed, Donatello grabs one of the Foot's machine guns and repeatedly shoots the Foot Elite. Donatello is visibly shaken by the violence and throws the gun away. At the end of the story the turtles, April and Casey move back to New York save for Donatello who chooses to stay in Northampton with Master Splinter to heal from his injury as well as reflect on everything that had happened. After encountering the turtle vigilante ally Nobody in civilian guise he returns with him to New York to help his brothers battle Baxter Stockman.

In the current comics, Donatello finds an armored truck in the sewers which apparently had been part of a bank robbery in the sixties. Along with Raphael and Casey Jones, he undertakes the task of fixing up the vehicle. Donatello decides to accompany the Utroms on a mission to Tepui to search for two missing research teams. The group are attacked by strange wooden creatures who shrink them to miniature size. The creatures turn out to be a group of Utroms which had been stranded in the Jungle during their first stay on Earth and had been living in secret thanks to their Quantum Inversion Redimensioning device which could alter their size. The process could not be reversed on Donatello, possibly due to his mutation, leaving him the size of an action figure. While the Utroms work on returning him to normal, Donatello put his new size to use infiltrating a terrorist organizations warehouse. He has also made a robotic body for him made to resemble a turtle to help him move around.

Image Comics
In the Image Comics incarnation of the TMNT, he became a cyborg after his body was partially destroyed after he was shot and dropped out of a helicopter (he maintained a positive attitude nonetheless, although he was constantly at risk of losing his mind to the cyborg half). He was almost killed by Image character Deathwatch by having his brain drained of mutagen, while assailing with mental torture tactics. Leonardo blamed the CPU of his injured brother's armor for his subsequent brain death; however, Donatello was not dead but was somehow separated from his body, and with the help of his brothers he returned to his body. In the independent published series of the Image Comics, Issue #24, Don's armor began to malfunction and was so powerful Donatello was on his last legs until he made a deal with Baxter Stockman who Don was reluctant to work with but had no choice. Donatello is rid of most of his body metal by issue #25 and Baxter informs him his shell had regrown and as a result he was back to being a non-cyborg turtle. Baxter died once more when Don's metal particles would not help restore his body; as a result Baxter requested Donatello give April O'Neil his regards and he died laughing maniacally. Donatello then went on to battle Lady Shredder and the foot clan with his brothers and Pimiko. Donatello was then by the end of the issue completely rid of all metal particles and had kept his and Baxter's ordeal a secret.

In the official IDW-published conclusion, TMNT Urban Legends, after Dr. X activated an EMP, the living armor abandoned Donatello for a new host, where it was discovered the armor had been impeding Donatello's natural healing abilities.

Archie Comics
Donatello's appearance in the Archie publications were largely based on the 1987 Fred Wolf incarnation, but with Mirage writers on board at Teenage Mutant Ninja Turtles Adventures such as Steve Murphy and Ryan Brown, a lot of references to his Mirage counterpart were made. Donatello was showcased to be pure of heart and soul, being able to pass through the Netherworld unscathed. He was also chosen of the Turtles by a group of Aliens known as the Sons of Silence to share their wisdom. He was one of the few who could telepathically communicate with them. Donatello was almost a pacifist, detesting every time he used violence.

IDW Publishing
In a shocking twist, Donatello was nearly killed at the end of issue #44 when Leonardo, Raphael and Michelangelo were on a mission to stop Krang from transforming the Earth using an alien device called the "Technodrome". Donatello was left at the home base, and while the others were away, he was attacked by Bebop and Rocksteady. After a brief fight, Rocksteady smashed Donatello's shell, nearly killing him.

The news of his supposed death spread all over the interview and IGN conducted an interview with script writer Tom Waltz, where he called the final scene a beautiful rendered scene, catching the emotion of the family. He also claimed there was no earthly way that Donatello could survive, but at the same time, he said it was not the end of him and his career.

In Issue #45, Donatello was not dead as his spirit was in an alternate plane and he was barely clinging to life. Leonardo, Michelangelo and Raphael carried Donatello's body into the freezer to slow down the bleeding and increase his chance of survival. Fugitoid says he needs to go to Burrow Island to get the equipment to save Donatello. Splinter finds Donatello's spirit and guides his son back to earth, however, due to Donatello wearing a helmet to keep his consciousness alive, his mind is in Metalhead, while his own body is being restored to how it was before his near demise.

In Issue #46, In Harold's lab, Donatello-as-Metalhead finishes prepping his body to be moved to the lair. He tries his best to remain brave, but being trapped in a robot body has been an upsetting experience. The Fugitoid tries to help Donnie adapt to having his mind in a robot body while Harold sees to Metalhead’s repairs (the robot having been trashed by Bebop and Rocksteady). Raphael storms off with Alopex following behind him. Raphael starts regretting leaving Donatello behind and seeing him in a robot body is too much for Raphael to handle, but as soon as Alopex and Leonardo give him some comfort he eventually accepts Donatello as Metalhead and he, Leo and Mikey go on patrol while Donatello and the Fugitoid transfer Donnie's turtle body to the lair of the turtles while Harold gets some equipment to help Donatello get back into his own body.

In issue #47, He mentioned to Fugitoid and Harold he is connected to his body's vital signs. Indicating he could still feel his body and was slowly getting back to normal. In issue #50, Metalhead self-destructed and Donatello returned to his organic body which has now been outfitted with an artificial shell. Since then he has been fighting alongside his brothers.

Personality
Donatello is a gifted scientist and mathematician. He does a lot of work with vehicles, technology, and experiments. Any science and math skill you can think of, he will do it all. Donatello is not as rowdy and violent as his brothers, but he can get a little annoyed with them on occasion. However he never loses his temper. Donatello is calm, sensible, quiet, friendly, and gentle. He does not get into a lot confrontations with his brothers. He is more interested in his work than in his ninjutsu but he still attends to ninja practice and works hard there as well as his projects.

Television

1987 animated series 
Donatello appears in the 1987 animated television series, voiced by Barry Gordon, and understudied for 3 episodes by  Greg Berg. In this series, he is depicted as the genius of the group who invents many of the turtles' vehicles and equipment including the Turtle Van, the Turtle Blimp and the Turtle Com. He is the calmer turtle out of the 4 turtles. Donatello made many revolutionary inventions, the most notable being the portable portal capable of opening gateways to other dimensions as well as an early warning system which warns of impending attacks from other dimensions or from Krang and Shredder.

Gordon reprised the role of the 1987 Donatello in five episodes of the 2012 TV series, "Wormquake!", "Trans-Dimensional Turtles" and the three part series final "Wanted: Bebop & Rocksteady".

Coming Out of Their Shells Tour 
The 1990 TMNT: Coming Out of Their Shells would have its first show broadcast from Radio City Music Hall on Pay Per View and later released on VHS. Donatello would be depicted as playing both a portable electric keyboard and in some iterations of the show after this initial show, a keyboard guitar. He was also depicted as having constructed all of the Turtles instruments. The Making Of VHS tape, which was set in the fictional 'universe' of the concert, depicted the Turtles as real people, and expanded on Donatello's interest in electronics, and confirms the concert's claim that he constructed the Turtles' instruments. He is also shown helping backstage during the construction of the set for the inaugural show.

1997 live-action series 
Donatello appeared in the live-action series, Ninja Turtles: The Next Mutation, as well as the crossover episode of Power Rangers in Space, portrayed by Richard Yee and voiced by Jason Gray-Stanford.

2003 animated series 
Donatello appears in the 2003 animated series, voiced by Sam Riegel. However he is more pacifistic in this incarnation. His skin color is a medium olive green color; this particular color is only used for him in the 2003 animation. In the third season, Donatello is transported into a future by Ultimate Drako where Shredder has took over the planet and the Turtles were unable to stop him and lost Splinter and Casey Jones to him and later split up because of infighting due to Donatello's absence. In the fourth season, during an outbreak of mutations of people and animals in New York, Donatello got a nasty gash by a monster while fighting several monsters with his brothers. Then in the episode two-part episode "Return of Savanti", Donatello ended up coming down with the sniffles. Later in the episode "Adventures in Turtlesitting", he went from a turtle who was home ill with the flu to a monster himself as a result of being infected by the outbreak. A similar situation happened with Raphael in the comics. In the seventh season, also called "Back to the Sewer", Donatello blamed himself for Master Splinter's decompiling and vowed to restore his bits from cyberspace. This obsession caused him to disregard anything else, such as the gang war between the Foot Clan and the Purple Dragons, as unimportant. It was not until seeing his brothers in danger from the Cyber Shredder did he realize he was ignoring his responsibilities to help them and promised not to let his obsession with saving Master Splinter take control again.

2012 animated series 
Donatello appears in Nickelodeon's 2012 animated series, voiced by Rob Paulsen. In this version, Donatello has a crush on April O'Neil (who is also in teenage years in this adaptation). Despite Donatello being quiet, sensitive, and friendly, he also can be sarcastic and is here more prone to panicking and losing his temper. Donatello is active and purpose-driven, but at times does not understand and/or has a hard time grasping the lectures of Master Splinter. A running gag is Raphael scolding or hitting him whenever he explains something in scientific terms. His character design was also updated, giving him a gap in his teeth and a taller, leaner appearance than his brothers. In this version, he wields a bō staff that converts to a naginata (Japanese halberd).

Donatello also shows to have a heart as big as his intelligence as he, like his brother Michelangelo, care for humans and creatures that others find a nuisance like The Pulverizer and Bigfoot. His passion to help others is most demonstrated when he creates a retro-mutagen to undo mutations that happen throughout the series.

2018 animated series 

Donatello appears once again in the 2018 series Rise of the Teenage Mutant Ninja Turtles, voiced by Josh Brener. This version is described as "an unflappable mechanical genius and tech wizard whose ninja skills are second only to his coding." This incarnation of Donatello is more confident, sociable, level-headed, and sarcastic, and wields a high-tech bō staff modified by rocket boosters. It is also confirmed that this version of Donatello falls on the autism spectrum.

In Rise of the Teenage Mutant Ninja Turtles: The Movie, Donnie mostly takes a backseat with Mikey, looking out for each other while they fight against the Krang. The two manage to seize control of the Technodrome, with Donnie organically connecting to the ship's main controls, before being ripped out by Krang Leader. After Leonardo sacrifies himself to save Earth from the Krang invasion, Mikey is able to open a portal to the prison dimension with the help of Donnie and Raph and rescue Leo.

Movies

Original trilogy (1990–1993) 
Donatello appears in the first three live action films. He is depicted as more childish than he was in the Mirage comics and the 1987 animated series, as he is shown joking around more. He is voiced by Corey Feldman in the first movie. In the second film, Teenage Mutant Ninja Turtles II: The Secret of the Ooze, Adam Carl provided his voice. He finds himself dejected when professor Perry reveals that the turtles' creation was a mere accident, as the ooze was just the result of chemical spillage rather than a deliberate product, but Splinter comforts him by telling him their worth is not defined by their past. He later assists Perry with the creation of an antidote to the Ooze, which the turtles use on Shredder's mutant minions, Tokka and Razhar. In the third film, Feldman reprises his role from the first film. He is the only Turtle who is not tempted to stay in the Feudal Japan of the past, saying that he can't live without technology.

2007 film 
Donatello has a supporting role in the 2007 film, voiced by Mitchell Whitfield. In the film, Donatello runs an IT tech support line to earn money for the family and keeps an eye on Mikey. He also serves as the turtles' unofficial leader until Leonardo returns from training in Central America.

Reboot series (2014–2016) 
Donatello appears in Teenage Mutant Ninja Turtles (2014), portrayed by Jeremy Howard. In this film, Donatello is the brains of the team and relies heavily on high-tech equipment and gear. His personality in this film is very calm and measured, and was also given a much more nerdy portrayal than in previous adaptations, on account of his large glasses with the middle taped. He also has a similar personality to his 1987 and 2003 counterparts where he is always talking of calculations and constantly confusing his brothers with them. He is also the one who stopped the toxic poison that Shredder had activated on Sacks Tower. Like Michelangelo and Leonardo, Donatello wears a glove on his left hand, has a tech pack on his shell and boots although you can partly see his toes making only him, Raphael and Michelangelo the only turtles to stay true to their other incarnations with the two toes. Donatello appears in the sequel, Teenage Mutant Ninja Turtles: Out of the Shadows, with Howard reprising his role. In the film, Donatello discovers the mutagen Shredder used on Bebop and Rocksteady cam be used to turn the turtles into humans, which Michelangelo overhears, leading to a brief friction between the team. He later hacks into the Technodrome's computer, allowing the turtles to find the beacon Krang is using to build it and send it back to Krang's native dimension.

DC crossover film 
Donatello appears in the direct-to-video crossover film Batman vs. Teenage Mutant Ninja Turtles, voiced by Baron Vaughn. He is the one who located the Batcave after an encounter with Batman. After becoming allies, he soon becomes fast friends with Batgirl and concocts an anti-mutagen alongside her to reverse the effects and nullify the plans of the Shredder and Ra's al Ghul, who developed a mutant army out of their henchmen. Near the climax, Ghul breaks Donatello's arm from a counter attack, resulting in Donatello having to guide Michelangelo through disabling the mutagen-disseminating device, which he does by recklessly smashing its parts. At the film's conclusion, Donatello's arm is placed in a sling by Alfred before he partakes in eating pizza with his brothers and newfound allies.

Mutant Mayhem 
Donatello is set to appear in the upcoming Teenage Mutant Ninja Turtles: Mutant Mayhem, the first computer-animated Teenage Mutant Ninja Turtles flim since TMNT (2007). He is shown to wear glasses, in contrast to his previous designs, and is confirmed to be voiced by an actual teenager with Micah Abbey voicing him. It’s established that this iteration of Donnie is a late bloomer, as shown by his younger sounding voice.

Video games 
In the video games based on the 1987 animated series, Donatello has the longest range, although he cannot inflict as much damage as Leonardo, who has the second-longest range; one notable exception is the first NES game, where Donatello both did the most damage and had the longest range, though his attacks were slow. This has been carried over into the games inspired by the 2003 animated series. In TMNT: Smash Up, he is voiced by Sam Riegel.

Donatello is one of the main playable characters in Teenage Mutant Ninja Turtles: Out of the Shadows, where he is voiced by Yuri Lowenthal. Donatello also appears in the 2014 film-based game, voiced by Oliver Vaquer.

Donatello is featured as one of the playable characters from Teenage Mutant Ninja Turtles as DLC in Injustice 2, voiced by Joe Brogie. While Leonardo is the default turtle outside the gear loadout, he, Michelangelo and Raphael can only be picked through the said loadout selection similar to the premier skin characters.

Donatello is featured as a TMNT season pass in Smite as a Sun Wukong skin, voiced by Landon McDonald. He is also available as a skin in Brawlhalla.

Donatello is also a main playable character in the sequel to Turtles in Time, titled Teenage Mutant Ninja Turtles: Shredder's Revenge. In the game, Donatello once more carries a high range stat, balanced by an average power stat and low speed. This is the first official Teenage Mutant Ninja Turtles game in which he is played by his original voice actor, Barry Gordon.

References

Animal superheroes
Child superheroes
Comic martial artists
Comics articles that need to differentiate between fact and fiction
Comics characters introduced in 1984
Fictional bojutsuka
Fictional characters from New York City
Fictional characters on the autism spectrum
Fictional electronic engineers
Fictional geneticists
Fictional humanoids
Fictional inventors
Fictional kobudōka
Fictional machinists
Fictional mutants
Fictional ninja
Fictional Ninjutsu practitioners
Fictional pacifists
Fictional polearm and spearfighters
Fictional roboticists
Fictional scientists in comics
Fictional turtles
Fighting game characters
Male characters in comics
Superheroes who are adopted
Teenage characters in comics
Teenage characters in television
Teenage Mutant Ninja Turtles characters
Teenage superheroes
Vigilante characters in comics